Gadomus colletti is a species of rattail. This deep-water fish is found in the waters around Japan, the Philippines, and northern Taiwan.

This species grows to around 40 cm (15.7 in) in length. This is a very pale fish with darker fins and white jaws. The head, unlike in many deep-water species, has firm bones and the mouth is wide and terminal with bands of villiform (brushlike) teeth. A long, filamentous chin barbel and a wide gill opening are present.

References
A new species, Caelorinchus sheni, and 19 new records of grenadiers (Pisces: Gadiformes: Macrouridae) from Taiwan - Chiou Mei-Luen; Shao Kwang-Tsao; Iwamoto Tomio

Macrouridae
Fish described in 1904
Marine fish of Asia
Fish of the Pacific Ocean
Fish of Japan
Fish of the Philippines
Fish of Taiwan
Taxa named by David Starr Jordan